Martina Trevisan (born 3 November 1993) is an Italian professional tennis player. Trevisan is the current Italian No. 1, has a career-high singles ranking of world No. 24 by the Women's Tennis Association (WTA), and in 2021 had a peak doubles ranking of world No. 138. In 2022, she won her first WTA Tour singles title at Rabat and reached her first major semifinal at the French Open.

Trevisan has also won ten singles titles and two doubles titles on the developmental ITF Women's Circuit. On that circuit, she had reached a career-high ranking of 57. Playing for the Italy Billie Jean King Cup team, Trevisan has a record of 6–3 (2–2 in singles and 4–1 in doubles, as of September 2022).

Career
In 2009, Trevisan reached the semifinals of both the French Open and the Wimbledon Championships in girls' doubles competitions.

2020: Grand Slam debut and first major QF in singles
In 2020, she made her Grand Slam debut at the Australian Open, overcoming former Wimbledon finalist Eugenie Bouchard in the qualifiers to reach the main draw before falling to eventual champion, Sofia Kenin, in straight sets. However, playing in double with Sara Errani, she arrives at the quarterfinal.

At the French Open, she came through the qualifiers to face Camila Giorgi;  Giorgi retired in the second set due to injury. In the second round, Trevisan beat Coco Gauff in three sets to progress to her first Grand Slam third round. She followed that up with a win against 20th seed Maria Sakkari, after losing the first set 1–6 and edging the second (saving two match points) in a tie-break. She then defeated fifth seed Kiki Bertens, in straight sets, to move into her first Grand Slam quarterfinal where she lost to the eventual champion, Iga Świątek, also in straight sets.

2021-22: First major SF & WTA title, top 30
In 2021, she was a quarterfinalist also at the Australian Open, in doubles partnering Aleksandra Krunić.

In 2022, she won her maiden title in Rabat defeating Claire Liu who was also a first-time WTA finalist. As a result she reached the top 60 at world No. 59 on 23 May 2022.

Trevisan continued her run of form by reaching her first Grand Slam semifinal at the French Open, defeating Harriet Dart, Magda Linette, Daria Saville, Aliaksandra Sasnovich, and 17th seed Leylah Fernandez, extending her winning streak to 10 matches before losing to Coco Gauff in the semifinals. She became the third Italian woman to reach the Roland Garros semifinals in the Open era, following 2010 champion Francesca Schiavone and 2012 finalist Sara Errani.

In July, she reached quarterfinals of the Budapest Grand Prix, in which she lost to Anna Bondár, in straight sets.

Personal life
She is the younger sister of Matteo Trevisan who was a professional tennis player on the ATP World Tour. Her father, Claudio Trevisan, was a professional football player.
Martina took a break from tennis for several years whilst she batlled with anorexia.n

Performance timelines

Only main-draw results in WTA Tour, Grand Slam tournaments, Fed Cup/Billie Jean King Cup and Olympic Games are included in win–loss records.

Singles
Current after the 2023 Dubai Open.

Doubles
Current after the 2023 Australian Open.

WTA career finals

Singles: 1 (1 title)

Doubles: 1 (1 runner-up)

WTA Challenger finals

Singles: 1 (1 runner-up)

ITF Circuit finals

Singles: 18 (10 titles, 8 runner–ups)

Doubles: 3 (2 titles, 1 runner–up)

WTA Tour career earnings
Current after the 2022 Wimbledon Championships

Career Grand Slam statistics

Seedings
The tournaments won by Trevisan are in boldface, and advanced into finals by Trevisan are in italics.

Best Grand Slam results details
Grand Slam winners are in boldface, and runner–ups are in italics.

Head-to-head records

Records against top 10 players
Trevisan's record against players who have been ranked in the top 10. Active players are in boldface.

Top 10 wins

Longest winning streak

10-match win streak (2022)

Notes

References

External links
 
 
 

1993 births
Italian female tennis players
Living people
Sportspeople from Florence